is a Japanese manga written and illustrated by Rieko Saibara. It was adapted into a live action film in 2013. In 2005, the manga, along with Mainichi Kaasan, won Saibara the Short story Award at the Tezuka Osamu Cultural Prizes.

Cast
 Kii Kitano as Natsumi Takahara
 Fumino Kimura
 Asuka Kurosawa
 Ittoku Kishibe
 Asaka Seto

References

External links

2004 manga
Live-action films based on manga
Manga adapted into films
Seinen manga
Shogakukan manga
Japanese comedy films